Tamaree is a rural residential locality in the Gympie Region, Queensland, Australia. In the  Tamaree had a population of 880 people.

Geography

The locality is bounded to the west by Old Maryborough Road.

The North Coast railway line enters the locality from the south-west (Banks Pocket) and exits to the north (Corella). The locality is served by the Tamaree railway station .

The land use is rural residential.

History

Tamaree Provisional School opened on 12 July 1904. On 1 January 1909 it became Tamaree State School. It closed on 31 March 1965.

On Saturday 18 October 1947  at Tamaree railway station the north-bound Townsville mail train crashed head-on into the stationary south-bound train from Rockhampton, with both trains carrying hundreds of passengers. Two crew in the south-bound train were killed along with six passengers in the north-bound train.

At the  Tamaree had a population of 664.

In the  Tamaree had a population of 880 people.

Education
There are no schools in Tamaree. The nearest government primary schools are Chatsworth State School in neighbouring Chatsworth to the west, Two Mile State School in Two Mile to the south-east, and Gympie West State School in Gympie to the south. The nearest government secondary school is James Nash State High School in Gympie to the south.

External links

References

Gympie Region
Localities in Queensland